Thomas Douglas Whittet (1915-1987) was a pharmacist and president of the History of Medicine Society of the Royal Society of Medicine from 1981 to 1983.

Selected publications
 "The apothecaries in the Great Plague of London", 1665 (Society of Apothecaries' Sydenham Lecture, 1965; Ewell, Surrey: Morgan, 1970).

References 

Presidents of the History of Medicine Society
British pharmacists
1915 births
1987 deaths